The Esperanto national football team (Esperanto: Esperanta nacia futbala teamo) is a football team representing Esperanto speakers worldwide. Esperanto is a member of the South American Board of New Football Federations and the N.F.-Board.

History
The Esperanto national football team was founded in 2014.

International results

References

Esperanto culture
Esperanto organizations
Football teams in Argentina